Walter Lewis Brown (January 4, 1861 – October 16, 1931) was an American librarian. Brown served as president of the American Library Association from 1916 to 1917. Brown was instrumental in establishing a public library in Buffalo, New York, now the Buffalo and Erie County Public Library. Brown led the American Library Association at the beginning of the first World War. In that role, Brown initiated a partnership between the American Library Association and the Library of Congress to create the ALA War Service Committee.

See also
 Buffalo and Erie County Public Library

External links
 Photograph: Walter L. Brown, President-elect of the American Library Association, 1916-17, Digital Collections, New York Public Library

References

 
 

American librarians
1861 births
1931 deaths